Thomas House is a historic home located at Ruthsburg, Queen Anne's County, Maryland.  It is distinguished by a stepped, two-part plan designed to represent two separate building phases and to have the appearance of a Federal brick townhouse with a lower, two-story wing.  It appears to have been built between 1798 and 1821.

It was listed on the National Register of Historic Places in 1976.

References

External links
, including photo from 1968, at Maryland Historical Trust

Houses in Queen Anne's County, Maryland
Houses on the National Register of Historic Places in Maryland
Houses completed in 1798
Federal architecture in Maryland
Historic American Buildings Survey in Maryland
National Register of Historic Places in Queen Anne's County, Maryland